Foreverland is the eleventh studio album by Irish chamber pop band the Divine Comedy, released on 2 September 2016 by Divine Comedy Records.

Accolades

Track listing

Personnel 
Personnel per liner notes included in Venus, Folly, Cupid & Time – Thirty Years of the Divine Comedy.

Musicians
 Neil Hannon – vocals, guitars, keyboards, piano, mandolin, banjo, zither, harmonica; bass and drums (tracks 1 and 7)
 Andrew Skeet – piano
 Simon Little – bass guitar
 Tim Weller – drums
 Ian Watson – accordion
 Rob Farrer – percussion
 Celine Saout – harp
 Karen Glen – harpsichord (track 6)
 Jake Jackson – backing vocals, claps and whistle solo (track 4)
 David Jackson – penny whistle (track 2)
 Cathy Davey – vocals (tracks 1 and 4)
 Billy Cooper – piccolo trumpet (track 6)
 Rosie Jenkins – oboe (track 7)

Production
 Jake Jackson – mixing
 Michele G. Catri – mixing
 Fiona Cruickshank – mixing
 John Prestage – mixing
 Luna Picoli-Truffaut – artwork co-star
 Raphaël Neal – photography
 Matthew Cooper – artwork and design
 John Service – packaging production
 Natalie de Pace – executive producer and management

Orchestra
 Andrew Skeet – conductor, additional orchestration
 Nathan Klein – additional orchestration
 Isobel Griffiths – orchestra contractor
 Lucy Whalley – orchestra contractor
 Adrian Smith, Alison Dods, Bruce White, Chris Worsey, Emma Owens, Everton Nelson, Frank Schaefer, Gillon Cameron, Ian Burdge, Ian Humphries, Lucy Wilkins, Matt Ward, Patrick Kiernan, Pete Hanson, Reiad Chibah, Richard George, Richard Bryce, Rick Koster, Simon Baggs, Steve Morris, Tom Pigott-Smith, Warren Zielinski – string section
 Billy Cooper, John Ryan, Mark Templeton, Matt Gunner, Richard Edwards, Richard Watkins, Sebastian Philpott, Trevor Mires – brass section
 Eliza Marshall, Martin Robertson, Richard Skinner, Rosie Jenkins – woodwind section

Charts

References 

2016 albums
The Divine Comedy (band) albums